Joshua Frank (born in Billings, Montana) is an American investigative journalist, author and editor living in the United States and covers current political and environmental topics. His work has been honored by the Society of Professional Journalists. Along with Jeffrey St. Clair, he is the editor of the alternative political magazine and website CounterPunch. His articles have appeared in Seattle Weekly, OC Weekly and regularly at CounterPunch and TomDispatch. Frank's journalism has been supported by The Nation Institute's Type Investigations.

Frank graduated from Billings West High School in 1997 and holds a graduate degree in environmental conservation from New York University.

Books 

 Left Out!: How Liberals Helped Reelect George W. Bush (2005) 
 Red State Rebels: Tales of Grassroots Resistance in the Heartland (2008) (co-edited with Jeffrey St. Clair) 
 Hopeless: Barack Obama and the Politics of Illusion (2013) (co-edited with Jeffrey St. Clair) 
 The Big Heat: Earth on the Brink (2018) (written with Jeffrey St. Clair) 
 Atomic Days: The Untold Story of the Most Toxic Place in America (2022)

References 

Year of birth missing (living people)
Living people
American alternative journalists
American male journalists
American non-fiction environmental writers
New York University alumni